The Arturo Michelena University (Spanish: Universidad Arturo Michelena, UAM) is the biggest private university in Valencia, Venezuela. It offers graduate and postgraduate studies in different areas, and has around 20,000 students, mostly coming from the central part of the country. The name comes from the Venezuelan artist Arturo Michelena.

Faculties

Faculty of Economic and Social Sciences
 Social Communication
 Psychology
 Public accountancy
 Commercial Administration

Faculty of Law and Political Sciences
 Law

Faculty of Health Sciences
 Physiotherapy
 Imagenology
 Histotechnology
 Citotechnology

Faculty of Engineering
 Electronic Engineer

Faculty of Fine Arts
 Arts
 Music
 Graphic Design
 Modern Languages

Master's Degree
 Administrative Law
 Criminal Law and Criminology

References

Universities in Venezuela
Buildings and structures in Valencia, Venezuela
Educational institutions established in 2001
2001 establishments in Venezuela